Albert Webster Edgerly (1852 – 1926) was a 19th and 20th century American social reform activist.  He believed in euthanasia programs, a healthy diet, and the power of personal magnetism, and began the Ralstonism movement as a way to live out this lifestyle.

Personal life
Born in Massachusetts to Rhoda Lucinda Stone and John Foss Edgerly, he graduated from the Boston University School of Law in 1876.  That same year he founded the Ralston Health Club.  He married Edna Reed Boyts on July 5, 1892, in McConnellsville, Pennsylvania. He practiced law in Boston, Kansas, and Washington, D.C. In 1896 he began living eight months of the year at Ralston Heights, New Jersey, in what is known as Hopewell.

He died November 5, 1926, in Trenton, New Jersey, and his wife sold the property the following year.

Self-help and religious writings
Under the pseudonym Edmund Shaftesbury, Edgerly was a prolific author of self-help and utopian religious texts, producing over 100 books, most of them "official" books to buy as a member of the Ralston Health Club. A recent critique described the books as "chock-full of racist rants, naive pseudoscience, and curmudgeonly attacks on modern society." He also dabbled unsuccessfully in real-estate speculation and the theater, and invented a language called "Adam-Man Tongue" that was "nothing more than a bizarre-looking version of English."

One of his books, Life Building Method of the Ralston Health Club, endorsed the consumption of whole grain cereal.  When William Danforth of animal feeds maker Purina Mills began making a breakfast cereal similar to the kind described in the book in 1898, he sought and received the endorsement of Edgerly to market Ralston breakfast cereal. Ralston cereal became so successful that in 1902 Purina Mills was renamed Ralston-Purina. The breakfast cereal operations evolved into Ralcorp.

Works

The Ralston brain regime : presenting a course of conduct, exercises and study, designed to develop perfect health in the physical brain, strengthen the mind, and increase the power of thought : a book of practice, more than theory Washington, D.C. : Martyn College Press, 1891
The Shaftesbury school of philosophy known as the story of our existences or the doctrine of diversity  Washington, D.C., Shaftesbury college, 1894
Companion book of complete membership in the Ralston Health Club : in seventeen departments ; being a complete study of the natural causes and the natural cures of disease, without medicines or apparatus of any kind Washington, D.C. : Martyn College Press Association, 1895
Cultivation of the chest Washington, D.C. : Martyn College Press, 1895
Book of general membership of the Ralston Health Club 7th ed. Washington, Martyn College Press Assoc., 1898
 Book of the Psychic Society: A Study of the Fourteen Unseen Powers That Control Human Life; and Containing Immortality, A Scientific Demonstration of Life After Death Washington: Ralston University Pub. Co., 1908
Life building method of the Ralston health club [Hopewell, N.J.] Issued by the Ralston health club 1920
Instantaneous Personal Magnetism: Combining an Absolutely New Method with the Best Established Teachings of the Past 14th edition enlarged; Manchester, UK: Psychology Pub. Co., 1935
A study of the unseen powers that control human life, 1908
Advanced Magnetism, 1906
Book of the mind and thought society, 1911
Brain tests, 1924
Child life, 1897
Complete membership in the Ralston health club, 1892
Cultivation of Personal Magnetism in Seven Progressive Steps: The Exercise...
Edgerly natural reader, 1912
Future seeing and destiny, 1912
GREAT PSYCHIC: The Master Power of the Universe
Higher magnetism
How to Get Rid of Sickness: Ralston Classic No. One
How to make personality pay; an introduction to the study of personal...
Immortality, 1898
Lessons in artistic deep breathing for strengthening the voice, 1888
Lessons in emphasis, 1893
Lessons in grace, 1889
Lessons in the art of extemporaneous speaking, 1889
Lessons in the art of facial expression, 1889
Lessons in the art of ventriloquism, 1891
Lessons in the mechanics of personal magnetism, 1888
Lessons in voice culture, 1891
Lessons on acting, 1889
Life Electricity
Life's secrets revealed
Mental Magnetism: a Study of the Seven Realms of Mind and Mastery in the Conflicts of Life, 1924
One hundred lessons in punctuation, 1893
One hundred points of character, 1892
Operations of the Other Mind: Making Known the Unseen Powers of the...
Personal magnetism
Private Lessons in the Cultivation of Magnetism of the Sexes
Ralston gardens, 1900
Ralston's simplified physiology, 1892
Real life, when things are right, 1903
Right, 1923
Sex magnetism, 1910
Shaftesbury's secrets
Solution of life, 1916
The Adam-man tongue, 1903
The authority dictionary, 1891
The book of books, 1897
The Book of Shaftesbury's Secrets: Disclosing Priceless Methods for...
The goal of creation, a constructive course in human progress within the temple of great achievements, 1920
The greatest things in human life, 1915
The natural reader, 1891
The new education, 1900
The origin of man, 1925
The Other Mind: Including The Science Of All Phenomena And The Practice Of all forms of human control of others, 1909
The Ralston health club, 1893
The Shaftesbury recitations, 1889
The two hundred year club, 1893
The two sexes, 1898
Thought Transference; or, The Radio-Activity of the Human Mind
Transference of thought, 1896
Universal magnetism; a private training course in the magnetic control of others, by the most powerful of all known methods, 1924
Yourself behind closed doors

References

Further reading
 Six, Janet. "Hidden History of Ralston Heights: The Story of New Jersey's Failed 'Garden of Eden.'" Archaeology (Vol 57, No 3), p. 30-35.

External links 
Instantaneous Personal Magnetism by Webster Edgerly at archive.org

1852 births
1926 deaths
American health and wellness writers
Ralston Purina
Boston University School of Law alumni
19th-century American writers
20th-century American non-fiction writers
Pseudoscientific diet advocates